A. George Palmer is an English former professional rugby league footballer who played in the 1950s.

Playing career

International honours
George Palmer won a cap for England while at Batley playing  in the 10-35 defeat by the Other Nationalities at Central Park, Wigan, on Wednesday 11 April 1951, in front of a crowd of 16,860.

County Cup Final appearances
George Palmer played left-, i.e. number 11, in Batley's 8-18 defeat by Huddersfield in the 1952 Yorkshire County Cup Final during the 1952–53 season at Headingley Rugby Stadium, Leeds on Saturday 15 November 1952.

References
1951 England statistics inadvertently allocated to Barrow's Reg Parker at rugbyleagueproject.org.

External links
Members of the '80 club' flourish on Batley caviare

Batley Bulldogs players
England national rugby league team players
English rugby league players
Possibly living people
Place of birth missing
Rugby league second-rows
Year of birth missing